Dmitri Alekseyevich Michurenkov (born 19 May 1995) is a Russian football forward. He plays for FC Rotor Volgograd.

Club career
He made his debut in the Russian Second Division for FC Kavkaztransgaz-2005 Ryzdvyany on 9 September 2012 in a game against FC Mashuk-KMV Pyatigorsk.

Rubin Kazan
On 14 August 2013, it was announced that he had joined FC Rubin Kazan on a 6-month loan, with an option to purchase at the end.

He made his debut for the reserve team in a 1–1 draw vs FC Ural Sverdlovsk Oblast's reserve team on 31 August 2013, coming on as a substitute. He made no appearances for the senior squad during his loan.

Fakel Voronezh
He made his Russian Football National League debut for FC Fakel Voronezh on 12 March 2016 in a game against FC Tyumen.

References

External links
 
 

1995 births
Sportspeople from Stavropol
Living people
Russian footballers
Association football forwards
FC Rubin Kazan players
FC Rotor Volgograd players
FC Fakel Voronezh players
FC Avangard Kursk players
FC Armavir players
FC Neftekhimik Nizhnekamsk players
FC Nizhny Novgorod (2015) players
FC Akzhayik players
FC SKA Rostov-on-Don players
Russian First League players
Russian Second League players
Kazakhstan Premier League players
Russian expatriate footballers
Expatriate footballers in Kazakhstan